Vicko Zmajević (21 December 1670 – 12 September 1745) was the Roman Catholic archbishop of Bar and Primate of Serbia and also the archbishop of the Archdiocese of Zadar.

Biography 
Zmajević was born in Perast, into the House of Zmajević, one of the most influential families in the region. He was appointed Archbishop of Bar on 18 April 1701 and Apostolic Administrator of Budva on 24 December 1701 and again on 12 August 1713. Zmajević at Bar church fair in 1702 had the title of Diocleciensis, totius regni Serviae primas, visitator Albanie. He was consecrated as bishop by Marino Drago, bishop of Kotor. Zmajević became the archbishop of Zadar on 22 May 1713. He resigned as Apostolic Administrator of Budva in 1714. He died in Zadar.

Legacy

The Croatian Encyclopedia describes him as a 'Croatian church politician and writer' and notes that his few remaining works are archived by HAZU.

See also

 Matija Zmajević
 Krsto Zmajević
 Andrija Zmajević
 Marko Ivanovich Voinovich

Notes

 (for Chronology of Bishops) 
 (for Chronology of Bishops) 

Zadar
1670 births
1745 deaths
Archbishops of Zadar
People from Perast